Aarron Loggins  (born January 9, 1985) is an American deaf performer, activist, and actor. He uses English and American Sign Language and worked on The C-Word, Shock Nation, short film, Warriors of the Red Ribbon and In Good Hands.   in 2019, Loggins performed the National Anthem and America the Beautiful at Super Bowl LIII in American Sign Language alongside singer Gladys Knight.

Early life and education 
Loggins was born on January 9, 1985, in Joliet IL. He moved to Washington DC after graduated from Joliet Central High School.  He then attended Gallaudet University.  He graduated in 2008 with a  Bachelor's degree in Theater Arts.

Loggins is a member of Phi Beta Sigma fraternity.  and Most Worshipful Prince Hall Grand Lodge (Widow's Son #7).

He was the Mister Deaf International of 2014.

Television 

 For My Man.... FBI Investigator/Buddy Friend  
 Evil Stepmother .... Police Officer 		 		
 Brida Killa .... Ron		
 Evil Twin .... Extra 	 		
 For My Woman .... Detective  		
 Deaf Cultural Documentary-HBO Series

Theatre 

 Party On: Romeo and  Juliet .... Himself
 Reach To Unreachable Star   .... Leading
 Who's Tommy .... Cousin Kevin
 Sheldon of DC ....  Sheldon
 Sense-able .... Himself
 Sign Language .... Benny
 Visible Language ....  Ennals Adams
 Fences ....  Lyons
Z: A Christmas Story.... Joseph

Filmography 

TED Talks: Why We Need You to Advocate for Universal Closed Captioning.... Himself
Warriors of the Red Ribbon ....  Dr. Jonas Daly/Akar
 Andrew Foster: Seeds of Hope ....  Dr. Gabriel Adepoju
 The Burlesques Lounge ....  Joseph
 In Good Hands ....  Tyler
 How To Get Girls .... Extra 
 The Helpful President .... Guest Appearance

Webisode

 C-Words .... Tahj 
 Shock Nation .... Student

References

External links 

 
 

21st-century American male actors
African-American male actors
American deaf people
Male deaf actors
Living people
1985 births
21st-century African-American people
20th-century African-American people